Twin Registry may refer to: 

 Twin registry, an article about twin registries in general
 Michigan State University Twin Registry, registry of twins produced by researchers at Michigan State University
 Minnesota Twin Registry, project by researchers at the University of Minnesota related to the Minnesota Twin Family Study
 TwinsUK, a registry of twins in the United Kingdom
 Vietnam Era Twin Registry, a registry of American twins who served in the Vietnam War